ARA Ingeniero Julio Krause (B-13) was an oil tanker ship in service with the Argentine Navy from 1993 to 2015, and with YPF from to 1981 to 1993. She was the first ship in the Argentine Navy to bear the name of Argentine engineer Julio Krause, who discovered oil in Comodoro Rivadavia in 1907.

Design 
Ingeniero Julio Krause was an oil tanker originally ordered by the Argentine oil company YPF ( Yacimientos Petrolíferos Fiscales) in the early 1980s, designed and built by the Argentine ASTARSA shipyard, at Buenos Aires, Argentina. The design allowed the ship to operate in both littoral and fluvial service.

Ingeniero Julio Krause had a steel single-bottom hull and the superstructure at the stern, with a single tripod mast and a large single funnel atop, behind the bridge; the cargo area was located in the middle of the ship and comprised 15 liquid cargo tanks with a capacity of 8,350 m3 served by three pumps, each able to transfer 500 m3/hour.

Ingeniero Julio Krause was powered by one 8-cylinder Sulzer 8 ZL 40/48 4T SA marine diesel engine of 5.800 hp @ 550 RPM, driving one variable-pitch propeller; with a maximum speed of 14.5 kn.

History 

Ingeniero Julio Krause was ordered by the Argentine oil company YPF ( Yacimientos Petrolíferos Fiscales) for its tanker fleet, laid down in 1980 and launched on 21 January 1981 at the ASTARSA shipyard; she was named after engineer Julio Krause, who in 1907 discovered oil in Comodoro Rivadavia, Argentine Patagonia. She was incorporated to YPF’s fleet later in 1981, and was sold to the Argentine Navy on 5 March 1993 at a price of USD 3.4 million. Julio Krause was commissioned later in 1993 with the same name, and was assigned to the Naval Transport Service ( Servicio de Transportes Navales) with pennant number B-13.

In addition to supporting the Navy’s operations, Ingeniero Julio Krause also provided transport services to private companies, especially YPF. In 2007 Julio Krause underwent corrective and preventive maintenance that allowed her to remain in permanent operational readiness. She carried out one logistic deployment supporting the Argentine fleet, and 28 maritime transport trips due to the increase in the consumption of gas oil in Argentina. These operations were carried out both in fluvial and oceanic coastal environments, including the ports of Zárate, Buenos Aires, and Montevideo.

In 2008 Julio Krause supported the deployment of the corvettes ARA Rosales and ARA Robinson to South Africa, to participate in Exercise ATLASUR VII, where she refuelled both ships.

In 2009, Julio Krause did not sail either supporting the fleet or private chartered due to union action starting in March; instead she underwent corrective and preventive maintenance at Puerto Belgrano Naval Base, and at Tandanor shipyard in October–November.

In October 2010 she participated in readiness exercises with the Argentine fleet.

In November 2013 Ingeniero Julio Krause was declared out of service due to its structural and equipment degradation, and also because from 2015 would not comply with oil tanker international safety regulations as she lacked a double hull. In September 2015, via decree 2041/2015, President Cristina Fernández de Kirchner authorized her use as a target ship for weapons training by the Argentine Navy fleet. She was sunk in early 2016 in the Argentine Sea after being hit with six surface-surface Exocet missiles and one SST-4 torpedo.

See also 
 Architecture of the oil tanker
 List of auxiliary ships of the Argentine Navy

Footnotes

References

Notes

Bibliography

Further reading

External links 
 Histarmar website - COMANDO DE TRANSPORTES NAVALES - Transportes Navales desde 1970 hasta ahora (accessed 2017-01-18)
 Histarmar website - FLOTA DE MAR 2015 (accessed 2017-01-18)
 Buque Tanque A.R.A. "Ingeniero Julio Krause " (accessed 2017-01-24)

Auxiliary ships of Argentina
Tankers of Argentina
Ships built in Argentina
1981 ships
Shipwrecks of the Argentine coast
Maritime incidents in 2016